A Further Range is a collection of poems by Robert Frost published in 1936 by Henry Holt and Company (New York) and in 1937 by Jonathan Cape (London).

Reception
The collection was awarded the Pulitzer Prize in 1937 for poetry.

Contents 
This volume is divided into 6 parts: 1-Taken Doubly; 2-Taken Singly; 3-Ten Mills; 4-The Outlands; 5-Build Soil; 6-A Missive Missile.

The dedication: "To E. F. for what it may mean to her that beyond the White Mountains were the Green; beyond both were the Rockies, the Sierras, and, in thought, the Andes and the Himalayas—range beyond range even into the realm of government and religion."

The poems had previously been published in The Saturday Review of Literature, The Yale Review, Poetry, Scribner’s Magazine, The Virginia Quarterly Review, The Atlantic Monthly, The American Mercury, and Books, Direction and The New Frontier.

References

External links
 

Works by Robert Frost
Poetry by Robert Frost
1936 poems
1930s poems
1936 poetry books
American poetry collections
Pulitzer Prize for Poetry-winning works